Vieux-Lixheim is a commune in the Moselle department in Grand Est in north-eastern France. The commune Lixheim lies 1 km to the south-east.

See also
 Communes of the Moselle department

References

External links
 

Vieuxlixheim